Benjamin Joseph Franklin (March 1839 – May 19, 1898) was a U.S. Representative from Missouri, and territorial governor of Arizona.

Born in Maysville, Kentucky, in March 1839, Franklin attended private schools, and Bethany College, Bethany, Virginia (now West Virginia) from 1849 to 1851.
He taught school.
He studied law.
He was admitted to the bar in 1859 and commenced practice in Leavenworth, Kansas.

Franklin was elected to the State senate of Kansas in 1861, but due to the outbreak of the Civil War never served.
He entered the Confederate States Army as a private.
He was promoted to the rank of captain and served throughout the Civil War.
He moved to Columbia, Missouri, and engaged in agricultural pursuits.
He moved to Kansas City, Missouri, in 1868 and resumed the practice of law.
He served as prosecuting attorney for Jackson County, Missouri from 1871 to 1875.

Franklin was elected as a Democrat to the Forty-fourth and Forty-fifth Congresses (March 4, 1875 – March 4, 1879).
He served as chairman of the Committee on Territories (Forty-fifth Congress).
He was a candidate for renomination, but withdrew.
He again engaged in the practice of law in Kansas City, Missouri.
He was appointed United States consul at Hankow, China, in 1885.
He returned to the United States in 1890 and settled in Phoenix, Arizona, and engaged in the practice of law.
He was appointed Governor of the Territory of Arizona and served from April 18, 1896, to July 29, 1897.
He died in Phoenix, Arizona, May 19, 1898.
He was interred in Rosedale Cemetery, a section of the Pioneer and Military Memorial Park in Phoenix.

See also
 History of Phoenix, Arizona
 Pioneer and Military Memorial Park

References

Sources

1839 births
1898 deaths
Lawyers from Kansas City, Missouri
Lawyers from Phoenix, Arizona
Kansas lawyers
Politicians from Leavenworth, Kansas
People from Maysville, Kentucky
People of Kansas in the American Civil War
Bethany College (West Virginia) alumni
Kansas state senators
Governors of Arizona Territory
Confederate States Army officers
Arizona Democrats
Democratic Party members of the United States House of Representatives from Missouri
Kansas Democrats
19th-century American politicians
19th-century American lawyers